Christophe Moyreau (4 April 1700 – 11 May 1774) was a French Baroque composer, organist and harpsichordist.

Biography 

Moyreau was born and spent most of his life in Orléans into an old family of the city. He became organist at Orléans Collégiale Saint-Aignan in February 1719 and at Orléans Cathedral in January 1738 and occupied this position until around 1772.

His music displayed a variety of stylistic innovations and was considerably different from his contemporaries' works. A provincial composer, Moyreau did not achieve much fame during his lifetime and is almost completely forgotten today. His most known and most frequently performed piece is Les Cloches d'Orléans, an organ composition that imitates the bells of Orléans Cathedral.

Works
Moyreau's surviving oeuvre consists of 6 livres of keyboard music. None of the pieces are dated, but it is known that Moyreau got a publication privilege on 30 January 1753 and that all six collections were published the same year, engraved by Marie-Charlotte Vendôme, one of the finest engravers of the era; who was also responsible for the first publication of Mozart's music in 1764 (KV6 and KV7). Moyreau dedicated the pieces to Louis Philippe I, Duke of Orléans (the full title read: Pièces de clavecin dédiées à Son Altesse Sérénissime Monseigneur le Duc d’Orléans). Only one exemplar of books I-II survives, and two of books III-VI.

The dance suites from books I-V are particularly notable for their length and variety of included pieces. A single suite may contain as many as 26 movements (which is far more than in any other suite ever composed), usually beginning with an introductory overture followed by several standard dance movements. The movements that come after these are usually pieces with descriptive titles, not unlike Couperin's, highly varied in style and mood. Livre 6, uniquely for French harpsichord music, consists of several three-movement keyboard simphonies written in Italian style.

Contemporary sources also mention a treatise by Moyreau, Petit abrégé des principes de musique par demandes et réponses (1753), which has been conserved at Orléans (Médiathèque), at the Cornell University of Ithaca and at the Newberry Library of Chicago (USA).

See also
 List of French harpsichordists

Bibliography
 TURELLIER (François), 'Christophe Moyreau (1700–1774) : organiste, claveciniste et compositeur orléanais', Bulletin de la Société Archéologique et Historique de l'Orléanais, Nouvelle série, T. XIX, N° 161, Décembre 2009, p. 5-39 (errata in : BSAHO, Nouvelle série, T. XX, N° 163, 1er semestre 2010, p. 134).
 HEAU (Gérard), 'Christophe Moyreau musicien d’Orléans (1700–1774) et sa famille', [Donnery], Typewriting, 1984, 12 p.

Free scores
 

French Baroque composers
French male classical composers
French harpsichordists
Musicians from Orléans
1700 births
1774 deaths
18th-century classical composers
18th-century keyboardists
18th-century French composers
18th-century male musicians